Dr. James O. Matthews Office was a historic doctor's office  located near Taylors Bridge, Sampson County, North Carolina.  It was built about 1900, and was a two-bay-by-two-bay, two-room frame office with a front gable roof.  It featured a pedimented porch which is supported by two octagonal columns made from a solid log.  It has been demolished.

It was added to the National Register of Historic Places in 1986.

References

Office buildings on the National Register of Historic Places in North Carolina
Office buildings completed in 1900
Buildings and structures in Sampson County, North Carolina
National Register of Historic Places in Sampson County, North Carolina